
Gmina Przedecz is an urban-rural gmina (administrative district) in Koło County, Greater Poland Voivodeship, in west-central Poland.

Villages
Apart from the town of Przedecz, Gmina Przedecz contains the villages and settlements of Arkuszewo, Broniszewo, Chrustowo, Dziewczopólko, Dziwie, Holenderki, Jasieniec, Józefowo, Katarzyna, Kłokoczyn, Łączewna, Lipiny, Mieczysławowo, Nowa Wieś Wielka, Rogóźno, Rybno, Zalesie, Żarowo, Zbijewo-Kolonia and Zbijewo-Parcele A.

Neighbouring gminas
Gmina Przedecz is bordered by the gminas of Babiak, Chodecz, Chodów, Dąbrowice, Izbica Kujawska and Kłodawa.

References
Polish official population figures 2006

Przedecz
Koło County